The 1969 Alcorn A&M Braves football team was an American football team that represented Alcorn A&M University in the Southwestern Athletic Conference (SWAC) during 1969 NCAA College Division football season. In their fourth season under head coach Marino Casem, Alcorn compiled an 8–0–1 record (6–0–1 against conference opponents), won the SWAC championship, and outscored opponents by a total of 274 to 82.

Alcorn A&M was also recognized as the black college national champion and was ranked No. 8 in the final Associated Press 1969 NCAA College Division rankings.

Schedule

References

Alcorn AandM
Alcorn State Braves football seasons
Black college football national champions
Southwestern Athletic Conference football champion seasons
Alcorn AandM football